Untitled, also known as Figure Group, is a 1960 sculpture by artist Joe Falsetti and architect David Schackne Jr., installed outside the east entrance of the Columbus Public Schools' Administration Office (270 East State Street) in Columbus, Ohio, United States.

Description and history
The artwork features four abstract fiberglass figures, each measuring approximately 13 ft. x 2 ft. 8 in. x 3 ft., on a steel armature. The teacher and three students are installed on an aggregate concrete base measuring approximately 1 ft. 1 in. x 7 ft. 1 in. x 7 ft. 1 in. The sculpture was surveyed by the Smithsonian Institution's "Save Outdoor Sculpture!" program in 1992.

See also
 1960 in art

References

External links
 Untitled – Columbus, OH at Waymarking

1960 establishments in Ohio
1960 sculptures
Abstract sculptures in the United States
Books in art
Outdoor sculptures in Columbus, Ohio
Sculptures of children in the United States
Statues in Columbus, Ohio